is a high school located in Noshiro, Akita, Japan. It was established in 1912. Noshiro Tech is best known for their powerhouse basketball and won Japanese high school championship 58 times.

Notable alumni
Shinji Akiba
Keishi Handa
Makoto Hasegawa
Noboru Hasegawa [it]
Takumi Hasegawa (basketball)
Reina Itakura
Mitsuhiko Kato
Yuki Kikuchi
Yuki Kitamuki
Yuta Kobayashi
Yuki Mitsuhara
Kaito Morizane
Shuhei Muto
Tatsuya Nishiyama
Junki Nozato (it)
Seiichi Oba
Shuji Ono
Yuki Sasaki
Kiyomi Sato
Mitsuaki Sato
Nobunaga Sato
Kimikazu Suzuki
Yuta Tabuse
Jun Takaku
Kenta Tateyama
Kazuki Tomokawa
Shingo Utsumi
Tomohide Utsumi
Kenji Yamada (basketball)
Koji Yamamoto (basketball)
Tadahiro Yanagawa (it)

See also
Slam Dunk (manga)
Sannoh Industry Affiliated High School
Takehiko Inoue

References

External links

Noshiro Basketball Club videos

Educational institutions established in 1912
1912 establishments in Japan
High schools in Akita Prefecture
Noshiro, Akita
Schools in Akita Prefecture